Vito Marija Bettera-Vodopić (1771–1841) was a writer and diplomat from the Republic of Ragusa.

Works 
Bettera entitled one of his political pamphlets Memoires sur une époque de ma vie ou appel aux hommes dhonneur et en particulier à ceux de Empire Vienne par Vite Marie de Bettera, Wodopich, gentilhomme ragusain (1816).

References

Sources 
Miljenko Foretić, Bettera, Vito Marija. Hrvatski biografski leksikon, I: pp. 731-732

1771 births
1841 deaths
Ragusan diplomats
Ragusan writers